Falls Township is one of the eleven townships of Hocking County, Ohio, United States. As of the 2010 census the population was 11,731, of whom 5,209 lived in the unincorporated portions of the township.

Geography
Falls Township consists of two disconnected portions in the center and northeast of the county, separated by a short distance. While many Ohio townships are composed of disjointed pieces due to municipal annexations, separation only by other townships is very uncommon.

Its northeastern portion (known as The Gore, or simply Gore) borders the following townships:
Monday Creek Township, Perry County - north
Coal Township, Perry County - east
Ward Township - southeast
Green Township - south
Marion Township - west

Its southwestern portion borders the following townships:
Marion Township - north
Green Township - east
Starr Township - southeast
Washington Township - south
Laurel Township - west
Good Hope Township - northwest

The majority of the city of Logan, the county seat of Hocking County, is located in the southwestern portion of Falls Township.

Name and history
Falls Township takes its name from a waterfall on the Hocking River, where a mill had been built in 1814, prior to the township's formation.

Statewide, the only other Falls Township is located in Muskingum County.

Government
The township is governed by a three-member board of trustees, who are elected in November of odd-numbered years to a four-year term beginning on the following January 1. Two are elected in the year after the presidential election and one is elected in the year before it. There is also an elected township fiscal officer, who serves a four-year term beginning on April 1 of the year after the election, which is held in November of the year before the presidential election. Vacancies in the fiscal officership or on the board of trustees are filled by the remaining trustees.

References

External links
County website

Townships in Hocking County, Ohio
Townships in Ohio